Passion Dust Intimacy Capsules are a novelty cosmetic product, introduced in 2017, that consists of capsules full of small, glittering particles that are intended to be inserted into the vagina before sex. The product is advertised as making the female genitalia "look, feel and taste soft, sweet and magical", but its use may carry serious health risks.

Characteristics
Passion Dust was invented by Lola-Butterflie Von-Kerius, an American who sells the product from her home via the Internet under the label Pretty Woman Inc. According to her website, the "passion dust" is made of gelatin, starch-based edible glitter, gum arabic, zea mays starch and vegetable stearate.

Health risks
Following reports of the viral success of Passion Dust in 2017, gynecologists interviewed by news media warned that the use of Passion Dust may carry serious health risks. The particles may disturb the bacterial balance of the vagina, and the starch and gelatin they contain may encourage the growth of harmful bacteria and fungi, which may cause infections such as bacterial vaginosis or vaginal yeast infection, and inflammation of the vagina. The particles may scratch the vaginal mucosa, allowing infection of the vaginal walls, and they may also migrate up through the cervix to cause similar damage to the lining of the uterus. The website of Pretty Woman Inc. states that the product is harmless.

References

Sex toys
Cosmetics
Products introduced in 2017